"Chiquitita" ("little girl" in Spanish) is a song recorded by Swedish pop group ABBA. It was released in January 1979 as the first single from the group's sixth album, Voulez-Vous (1979). Agnetha Fältskog performs the lead vocals. Originally, the track "If It Wasn't for the Nights" was going to be the album's lead single, but after "Chiquitita" was completed those plans were abandoned, and it would remain an album track.

Background and release
Many preliminary versions of "Chiquitita" exist. It had working titles of "Kålsupare", "3 Wise Guys", "Chiquitita Angelina" and "In The Arms of Rosalita". A revised version, which had a sound that was influenced by the Peruvian song "El Condor Pasa (If I Could)" performed by Simon and Garfunkel, was recorded in December 1978 and released as a single in January 1979.

With the success of the English version, ABBA also recorded "Chiquitita" in Spanish and it was one of the featured tracks on the Spanish-language release Gracias Por La Música.

Reception
"Chiquitita" proved to be one of ABBA's biggest hits. It was featured in a 1979 UNICEF charity event, the Music for UNICEF Concert, broadcast worldwide from the United Nations General Assembly. As a direct result of this event, ABBA donated half of all royalties from the song to UNICEF. "Chiquitita" was a No. 1 hit in Belgium, Finland, Ireland, the Netherlands, New Zealand, Spain, Switzerland, Mexico, South Africa and Rhodesia. It was a Top 5 hit in ABBA's native Sweden, the United Kingdom (peaking at No. 2 in both countries where Blondie's "Heart of Glass" was occupying the top spot), Australia, West Germany and Norway. This makes it the most successful single from the Voulez-Vous album in terms of global charts and one of the most famous charity songs ever. To this day, 50% of the proceeds from the song go to UNICEF in recognition of the "International Year of the Child" in 1979. In 2014, all ABBA members agreed on increasing their donation to 100% of all royalties from the song to UNICEF. As of 2021, the song's royalties have raised $4.8 million for the charity.

In the United Kingdom, "Chiquitita" debuted at No. 8 in the singles chart, making it the highest place début for any ABBA single release.

In Argentina, sales figures up to the end of July 1979 on the single show 500,000 in the Spanish edition, and 25,000 in the original English language format.

Cash Box said that it has "a bouncy tune" and "soaring harmonies."

As of September 2021, it is ABBA's ninth-biggest song in the UK including both pure sales and digital streams.

Music video
"Chiquitita" was one of the very few singles ABBA released without a custom-made video. Since then, on compilations of the group's videos, a contemporary TV performance of the song has been used, recorded in mid-February 1979, a month after the single's release. This clip was taped by the BBC during recording of the show ABBA in Switzerland, broadcast across Europe at Easter 1979, although this clip did not feature in the broadcast, being intended for a Christmas programme. ABBA are seen performing the song on a mountainside, with a snowman in the background. Throughout the clip, the bad weather and bad light caused problems during filming, which affected Anni-Frid Lyngstad; her hair constantly flew in her face, and she was forced to keep moving it out of her eyes, so it was not used. During the location shoot in Leysin, the BBC recorded two further versions of the group lip-synching to the song. The group performed the song inside the BBC Big Top used to host ABBA in Switzerland which was included in the final broadcast and a second video was shot of the group sitting around a table in a cafe, for the show Christmas Snowtime Special shown on BBC1 on 23 December 1979, hosted by Dame Edna Everage. The clip of the group filmed outside with the snowman was originally intended for this Christmas show, but producer/director Michael Hurll recorded the second clip as he was not happy with the first. In March 2022, a new lyric video was released featuring the mountainside footage.

Personnel
 Agnetha Fältskog – lead vocals
 Anni-Frid Lyngstad – backing vocals
 Björn Ulvaeus – guitar
 Benny Andersson – keyboards

Charts

Weekly charts

Year-end charts

Certifications and sales

Cher version

On May 8, 2020, American singer-actress Cher announced she had re-recorded Chiquitita in Spanish with all proceeds going to UNICEF, similar to how ABBA had done in 1979 with the release of the same song.

Cher's Spanish version of "Chiquitita" became her first song to chart on a US Latin Chart ever. It charted at No. 6 on the US Latin Digital Song Sales (Billboard).

Music video
An accompanying music video for "Chiquitita" was premiered on UNICEF's website on 9 May 2020, and uploaded to Cher's official YouTube channel shortly afterwards. Cher shot her part at home, with the final cut of the video featuring children from around the world in it.

Track listings and formats
Digital download
 "Chiquitita (Spanish Version)" – 4:49
 "Chiquitita" – 5:14

Credits and personnel
Credits for Dancing Queen adapted from AllMusic.

Management
 Published by Universal Songs of PolyGramInt., Inc. (ASCAP) and EMI Grove Park Music Inc. (BMI)
 Recorded by Mark Taylor and Paul Meehan at Metrophonic Studios, London
 Mixed at by Matt Furmidge and Mark Taylor at Metrophonic Studios, London
 Mastered by Sthephen Marcussen Mastering, Hollywood, CA

Personnel
 Cher – primary vocals
 Ash Soan – drums
 Adam Phillips – guitars
 Hayley Sanderson – backing vocals
 Andy Caine – backing vocals

Charts

Other covers 
A Spanish various version of Chiquitita were recorded by Puerto Rican boy band Menudo. One version was along singer Ednita Nazario.

A Spanglish version of Chiquitita was recorded by Spanish singer Charo for her 1981 studio album Bailando con Charo.

A Spanish version of Chiquitita released as a single by Amaia Montero in 2010 became a number one in the Spanish charts.

A euro-reggae version was included on the Abba cover album "Thank You For The Music" by eurodance act E-Rotic in 1997.

The song was covered in Spanish by Mexican 80s pop girls group Pandora.

A French version of the song was released by Nana Mouskouri in 1984.

 Sinéad O'Connor recorded a version released in 1999 on the album Across the Bridge of Hope, a compilation created and recorded in support of victims of the Omagh bombing, by Tim Hegarty and Ross Graham.

References

1979 singles
ABBA songs
Atlantic Records singles
Charity singles
Charo songs
Cher songs
Dutch Top 40 number-one singles
Epic Records singles
European Hot 100 Singles number-one singles
Number-one singles in Finland
Irish Singles Chart number-one singles
Number-one singles in Mexico
Number-one singles in New Zealand
Number-one singles in South Africa
Number-one singles in Spain
Number-one singles in Switzerland
Polar Music singles
Songs written by Benny Andersson and Björn Ulvaeus
UNICEF
Warner Records singles